Aracely Andrea Leuquén Uribe (born 24 November 1980) is a Chilean politician. She is a member of the Chamber of Deputies of Chile from the National Renewal Party. A traditionalist conservative, she opposes same-sex marriage and abortion. When she took office on March 11, 2018, she became one of the first two Mapuche women elected to the Chilean Congress, together with her Socialist counterpart Emilia Nuyado. She did not run for re-election in 2021.

References 

Living people
1980 births
21st-century Chilean women politicians
21st-century Chilean politicians
Chilean people
Chilean anti-abortion activists
Chilean people of Basque descent
Chilean people of Mapuche descent
Huilliche people
Mapuche women
Members of the Chamber of Deputies of Chile
National Renewal (Chile) politicians
Women members of the Chamber of Deputies of Chile
Deputies of the LV Legislative Period of the National Congress of Chile